Gloria is the fourth studio album by English singer and songwriter Sam Smith, released on 27 January 2023 through Capitol Records. Smith's first album since Love Goes (2020), it debuted at number one in United Kingdom, Australia and Ireland, and has moved over 1.6 million album-equivalent units worldwide.

It was preceded by the singles "Love Me More", "Unholy", a collaboration with Kim Petras, and "Gimme", a collaboration with Koffee and Jessie Reyez. "Unholy" was promoted as the lead single and topped the charts in Australia, Austria, Canada, Ireland, New Zealand, the United Kingdom, and the United States, becoming both Smith and Petras' first chart-topper in the latter. Upon release, the album received generally favourable reviews from music critics.

Background and recording
The album was recorded between Los Angeles, London and Jamaica, with Smith working with regular collaborators Jimmy Napes, Stargate and Ilya Salmanzadeh, as well as expecting further contributions from Los Hendrix, Max Martin and Calvin Harris. Smith stated that the album "feels like a coming of age" and got them "through some dark times", and expressed a hope that it could also be a "beacon" for listeners. A press release called it a "personal revolution" for Smith, containing the "dazzling, sumptuous, sophisticated, unexpected and at times thrilling, edgy sound of Sam's creative heart today", as well as lyrics about "sex, lies, passion, self-expression, and imperfection".

Promotion
Smith announced the album on their social media accounts on 17 October 2022, writing a note to their "dearest sailors", Smith's name for their fans, and sharing the cover art, a portrait of Smith with bleached hair wearing a golden earring of an anchor and pearl. Smith performed "Unholy" with Petras and "Gloria" with Sharon Stone as the musical guest on Saturday Night Live.

Singles
The first track to be released from the album was the single "Love Me More" on 28 April 2022. "Unholy", a collaboration with German singer Kim Petras, followed on 22 September 2022 and was promoted as the lead single. It reached number one in several countries, including Australia, Canada, the UK and the US, as well as number one on the Billboard Global 200.

The track "Gimme" was released as the album's third single on 11 January 2023. It is a collaboration with Canadian singer-songwriter Jessie Reyez and Jamaican musician Koffee.

On 27 January 2023, the same day of the album's release, "I'm Not Here to Make Friends" was released as the fourth single.

Promotional singles 
"Gloria" was released on 20 January 2023, one week before Gloria, as a promotional single.

Gloria the Tour

Critical reception

Gloria received generally positive reviews. At Metacritic, which assigns a normalized rating out of 100 to reviews from professional publications, the album received an average score of 68 out of 100, based on 16 reviews. Aggregator AnyDecentMusic? gave it 6.0 out of 10, based on their assessment of the critical consensus. Maura Johnston of Rolling Stone called Gloria Smith's "deepest album yet" and described it as "a compact, steadily flowing collection of pop songs that showcase Smith's vocal versatility and personal growth" with lyrics about "Smith's experiences as a queer person who was raised Catholic" throughout. Gary Bushell of the Daily Express found the album to be "less gloomy than 2020's Love Goes, beautiful in places, and packed with surprises". Nick Levine of NME wrote that the album "really is the most surprising, satisfying and vital work of [Smith's] career" and at its heart is a "personal exploration of the broader queer experience that recalls George Michael's classic 1996 album Older".

Reviewing the album for The Guardian, Alexis Petridis was critical of the press release's claims of "experimentation", writing that while there are "hints of R&B, trap and disco" amongst the ballads and tracks similar to their "piano-led sound" of previous releases, "there's still something underwhelming about Gloria: the feeling that it's more of the same is more prevalent than it should be". David Smyth of the Evening Standard felt that "Unholy", a "masterpiece of oversexualised nonsense", "sticks out outrageously in the middle of this fourth album" as the rest of the tracks are "rather grey" by comparison. Smyth concluded that it is "a shame the songs, well crafted as they are, don't always match the self belief" Smith's lyrics have. Writing for The Observer, Kitty Empire denoted that the project does not fulfill its potential, as it was not pushed to the levels of Beyoncé's Renaissance, an album that deals with similar themes and sounds, pointing out that "something slinky [...] might have been more apposite on an album dedicated to fun – and liberation from the past" over tracks like "How to Cry", "Gloria" and "Who We Love".

Lindsay Zoladz of The New York Times found that Smith "puts aside ballads for more danceable tracks" and while the album "has moments of boldness", ultimately "its occasional lapses into generics keep it from feeling like a major personal statement". Writing for Pitchfork, Jamieson Cox opined that by this point of Smith's career, "an artist whose writing has long tended toward the bland and impersonal has grown into a vision and identity that can be compromised by mediocre features" like those of Jessie Reyez, with Cox calling "Gimme" and "Perfect" "anodyne at best and grating at worst", and Ed Sheeran, with Cox finding "Who We Love" to be "basically [...] Sheeran's 'Same Love'," with lyrics that lay out "trite scenes".

Emma Madden, reviewing for Metro, gave the album two out of five stars, writing that "sex and queerness do indeed feature in the album, but in a way that feels tacked on out of obligation [...] The references are extremely ham-fisted and obvious". Madden also felt that Gloria feels "slipshod and confused".

Commercial performance
Gloria debuted at number one on the UK Albums Chart, becoming the singer's third non-consecutive album to reach the top, joining In the Lonely Hour (2014) and The Thrill of It All (2017). In Australia, Gloria became the singer's first album to debut atop the ARIA Albums Chart and second number-one album overall.

The album debuted at number seven on the US Billboard 200 with 39,000 album-equivalent units, earning Smith their fourth US top-10 album.

As of February 2023, Gloria has moved over 1.6 million units worldwide.

Track listing

Notes
 taken from Gay and Proud, a 1970 film by Lilli Vincenz
 contains samples of Divine from Pink Flamingos and "Over the Rainbow" by Judy Garland

Personnel
Musicians

 Sam Smith – vocals (1, 2, 4–9, 11–13), programming (tracks 3, 10), background vocals (6)
 Jodi Milliner – bass guitar (1, 2, 5, 7, 8)
 Ben Jones – guitar (1, 2, 5, 7, 8, 11)
 Reuben James – organ (1), Rhodes (2, 8), piano (5, 8)
 Jimmy Napes – programming (1, 2, 4, 5, 9), background vocals (6)
 Mikkel S. Eriksen – programming (1, 2, 5, 9)
 Tor Erik Hermansen – programming (1, 2, 5, 9)
 Alexis Marche Addison – additional vocals (1)
 Amber Clemons – additional vocals (1)
 Ant Clemons – additional vocals (1)
 Ashley Clemons – additional vocals (1)
 Cedric Jackson II – additional vocals (1)
 Daniel Cagan – additional vocals (1)
 Darien Champagne – additional vocals (1)
 Dylan Del-Olmo – additional vocals (1)
 Eric Bellinger – additional vocals (1)
 Jasmine "GoGo" Morrow – additional vocals (1)
 Jeremih – additional vocals (1)
 Julian Blake Ray – additional vocals (1)
 Julian Tabb – additional vocals (1)
 Jwan Anthony – additional vocals (1)
 Scott Carter – additional vocals (1)
 Shameka Marie – additional vocals (1)
 Solomon Fulton – additional vocals (1)
 Tayler Green – additional vocals (1)
 Ty Dolla Sign – additional vocals (1)
 Vanessa "Nettie" Wood – additional vocals (1)
 Jerry Wonda – bass guitar (1)
 Ladonna Young – background vocals (2, 8, 9), vocals (4)
 Vula Malinga – background vocals (2, 8, 9), vocals (4)
 Patrick Linton – background vocals (2, 9), vocals (4)
 Chris Worsey – cello (2, 3, 5, 6, 8, 11, 13)
 Ian Burdge – cello (2, 3, 5, 6, 8, 11, 13)
 Tony Woollard – cello (2, 3, 5, 6, 8, 11, 13)
 Vicky Matthews – cello (2, 3, 5, 6, 8, 11, 13)
 Chris Laurence – double bass (2, 3, 5, 6, 8, 11, 13)
 Stacey Watton – double bass (2, 3, 5, 6, 8, 11, 13)
 Earl Harvin – drums (2, 5, 8)
 Simon Hale – string arrangement (2, 3, 5, 6, 8, 11, 13)
 Adrian Smith – viola (2, 3, 5, 6, 8, 11, 13)
 Andy Parker – viola (2, 3, 5, 6, 8, 11, 13)
 Jenny Lewisohn – viola (2, 3, 5, 6, 8, 11, 13)
 John Metcalfe – viola (2, 3, 5, 6, 8, 11, 13)
 Reiad Chibah – viola (2, 3, 5, 6, 8, 11, 13)
 Charis Jenson – violin (2, 3, 5, 6, 8, 11, 13)
 Charlie Brown – violin (2, 3, 5, 6, 8, 11, 13)
 Everton Nelson – violin (2, 3, 5, 6, 8, 11, 13)
 Ian Humphries – violin (2, 3, 5, 6, 8, 11, 13)
 Louisa Fuller – violin (2, 3, 5, 6, 8, 11, 13)
 Lucy Wilkins – violin (2, 3, 5, 6, 8, 11, 13)
 Marianne Haynes – violin (2, 3, 5, 6, 8, 11, 13)
 Natalia Bonner – violin (2, 3, 5, 6, 8, 11, 13)
 Patrick Kiernan – violin (2, 3, 5, 6, 8, 11, 13)
 Perry Montague-Mason – violin (2, 3, 5, 6, 8, 11, 13)
 Richard George – violin (2, 3, 5, 6, 8, 11, 13)
 Steve Morris – violin (2, 3, 5, 6, 8, 11, 13)
 Warren Zielinski – violin (2, 3, 5, 6, 8, 11, 13)
 Blake Slatkin – programming (4)
 Cirkut – programming (4), background vocals (6)
 Ilya – programming (4), background vocals (6)
 Omer Fedi – programming (4); bass guitar, guitar (7)
 Nuno Bettencourt – guitar (5)
 Jessie Reyez – vocals (5, 9, 11)
 Kim Petras – vocals (6)
 Mike Hough – background vocals (8)
 Loshendrix – programming (8)
 Nez – programming (8)
 Koffee – vocals (9)
 Calvin Harris – programming (11)
 Alison Ponsford-Hill – background vocals (12)
 Andrew Tipple – background vocals (12)
 Caroline Fitzgerald – background vocals (12)
 Catriona Holsgrove – background vocals (12)
 Christina Gill – background vocals (12)
 Edmund Hastings – background vocals (12)
 Edward Ballard – background vocals (12)
 Edward Grint – background vocals (12)
 Elizabeth Poole – background vocals (12)
 George Cook – background vocals (12)
 Henry Moss – background vocals (12)
 Jacqueline Barron – background vocals (12)
 James Botcher – background vocals (12)
 James Davey – background vocals (12)
 Jenni Harper – background vocals (12)
 Jonathan Wood – background vocals (12)
 Judi Brown – background vocals (12)
 Ksynia Loeffler – background vocals (12)
 Lotte Betts-Dean – background vocals (12)
 Natalie Clifton Griffith – background vocals (12)
 Philip Brown – background vocals (12)
 Philippa Murray – background vocals (12)
 Robin Bailey – background vocals (12)
 Ruth Kiang – background vocals (12)
 Sara Davey – background vocals (12)
 Steve Trowell – background vocals (12)
 Vanessa Heine – background vocals (12)
 Victoria Meteyard – background vocals (12)
 London Voices – choir (12)
 Lucy Goddard – chorus master (12)
 Ben Parry – musical direction (12)
 Johnny McDaid – bass guitar, guitar (13)
 Chris Laws – drums (13)
 Steve Mac – keyboards (13)
 Ed Sheeran – vocals (13)

Technical

 Randy Merrill – mastering
 Kevin "KD" Davis – mixing (1)
 Steve Fitzmaurice – mixing (2, 3, 5, 8–11, 13)
 Serban Ghenea – mixing (4, 6, 7)
 David Odlum – mixing (12)
 Gus Pirelli – engineering (1, 2, 4–9, 11–13)
 Mikkel S. Eriksen – engineering (1, 2, 5, 9, 11)
 Gordon Davidson – engineering (2–6, 8, 11–13)
 Chris Laws – engineering (13)
 Dan Pursey – engineering (13)
 Freddie Light – additional engineering (2–6, 8, 11–13)
 George Oulton – additional engineering (2–6, 8, 11–13)
 Bryce Bordone – mixing assistance (4, 6, 7)
 Thomas Warren – engineering assistance (1)
 Ed Farrell – engineering assistance (2, 4–9, 11)
 Miles Wheway – engineering assistance (2–6, 8, 11, 13)
 Natalia Milanesi – engineering assistance (2–6, 8, 11, 13)
 Ira Grylack – engineering assistance (4, 6–8)
 Lance Powell – engineering assistance (8, 12)

Charts

Release history

References

2023 albums
Albums produced by Calvin Harris
Albums produced by Cirkut
Albums produced by Ilya Salmanzadeh
Albums produced by Jimmy Napes
Albums produced by Omer Fedi
Albums produced by Stargate
Capitol Records albums
Sam Smith (singer) albums